Ava Teresa Collins (born 18 April 2002) is a New Zealand footballer who plays as a midfielder for the St. John's Red Storm and the New Zealand national team.

International career
Collins played for the New Zealand U-20 team, winning the 2019 OFC U-19 Women's Championship in the Cook Islands which qualified them for the 2021 FIFA U-20 Women's World Cup before it was cancelled. She scored six goals across the four games she played in, five coming in one game against American Samoa.

She made her international debut for New Zealand in their 1–5 loss to Canada in October 2021.

References

External links
 

2002 births
Living people
Women's association football midfielders
New Zealand women's association footballers
New Zealand women's international footballers
St. John's Red Storm women's soccer players
Expatriate women's soccer players in the United States
New Zealand expatriate women's association footballers
New Zealand expatriate sportspeople in the United States
People educated at St Cuthbert's College, Auckland